Andrej Ilić (born 3 April 2000) is a Serbian professional footballer who plays as a centre-forward for Latvian club RFS.

Club career
On 3 September 2021, he signed a three-year contract with RFS in Latvia.

Honours
RFS
 Latvian Higher League: 2021
 Latvian Cup: 2021

References

External links
 
 
 
 SuperLiga profile

2000 births
Living people
Footballers from Belgrade
Association football forwards
Serbian footballers
FK Javor Ivanjica players
FK Napredak Kruševac players
FK RFS players
Serbian SuperLiga players
Latvian Higher League players
Serbian expatriate footballers
Expatriate footballers in Latvia
Serbian expatriate sportspeople in Latvia
Serbia under-21 international footballers